National Highway 544, commonly referred to as NH 544, (old number NH 47) is a  National Highway in South India connecting Salem city in Tamil Nadu to the city of Kochi in Kerala. It is also called the Salem-Kochi Highway. The highway runs through the states of Kerala and Tamil Nadu, connecting various important cities and towns such as Salem, Erode, Coimbatore, Palakkad, Thrissur and Kochi. It is a spur of National Highway 44, which forms the North South Corridor of the National Highway network of India.It passes south of Coimbatore. NH544 is the only highway in kerala which is fully 4lane (partially 6 lane also) including kuthiran Road Tunnel . It was formerly designated National Highway 47.

Route description 
Starts from NH44 near Salem and passes through Coimbatore, Palakkad, Thrissur, and ends at junction with NH66 at Edapally in Kochi.

Major intersections 
{| class="plainrowheaders wikitable"
|-
!scope=col|State
!scope=col|District
!scope=col|Location
!scope=col|km
!scope=col|mi
!scope=col|Destinations
!scope=col|Notes
|-
|rowspan="4"|Tamil Nadu
|rowspan="1"|Salem
|Salem
|km= 
| - Bangalore, Namakkal, Chennai
| Western end of the highway.
|-
|rowspan="3"|Coimbatore
| Neelambur
|km= 
| Coimbatore
| Coimbatore bypass starting.
|-
| Saraswathi Hospitals
|km= 
| - Coimbatore, Karur
|-
| Eachanari Pirivu
|km= 
| - Coimbatore, Pollachi
|
|-
|rowspan="9"|Kerala
|rowspan="2"|Palakkad
|Palakkad
|km= 
| -  Kozhikode
| 
|-
|Kannadi
|km= 
|  - Chittur
| 
|-
|rowspan="4"|Thrissur
|Mannuthy
|km= 
| Thrissur
|
|-
|Kodakara
|km= 
| - Kodungallur
|
|-
|Potta
|km= 
| - Irinjalakkuda
|
|-
|Chalakkudy
|km= 
| - Athirappilly
| Athirapilly waterfalls
|-
|rowspan="3"|Ernakulam
|Angamaly
|km= 
| - Muvattupuzha, Munnar, Kottayam
| SH 1 - Angamaly to Thriuvananthapuram
|-
|Athani
|km= 
| Expressway to Cochin International Airport
| 5 km to airport.
|-
|Edapally
|km= 
| - Thiruvananthapuram, Kanyakumari, Kozhikode
|

Surveillance
In an effort to improve the traffic systems, the Kerala Road Safety Authority (KSRA) has completed the first phase of installation of high-tech automatic traffic enforcement systems on the 98 km Edappally-Mannuthy stretch of NH 544. As part of the Rs 8.5 crore project, 65 automatic traffic enforcement systems will be installed at 23 points on the stretch.
The monitoring technology involves a mixture of virtual sensors, motion detectors, inductive sensors, logo sensors and high resolution cameras. Pictures of number plates would be captured using 10 megapixel cameras. The main server that will be linked to all cameras will be set up at the deputy transport commissioner's office. The magnetic sensors installed on roads will trigger the cameras in case of violations and send a message to the main server. Offenders will be traced based on visuals of vehicles and registration plates and they will be issued notice. The project is being implemented by KSRA and the Motor Vehicles Department with the technical support of Keltron as part of the decision to observe 2011-2020 as the 'decade of action for road safety'.

See also
 National Highways Development Project
 Coimbatore-Salem Industrial Corridor

References

External links
 Openstreetmap 

National highways in India
Transport in Kochi
Transport in Salem, Tamil Nadu
Transport in Erode
National Highways in Tamil Nadu
National Highways in Kerala